Curassows are one of the three major groups of cracid birds. They comprise the largest-bodied species of the cracid family. Three of the four genera are restricted to tropical South America; a single species of Crax ranges north to Mexico. They form a distinct clade which is usually classified as the subfamily Cracinae.

Evolution
In line with the other 3 main lineages of cracids (chachalacas, true guans, and the horned guan), mt and nDNA sequence data indicates that the curassows diverged from their closest living relatives (probably the guans) at some time during the Oligocene, or c.35–20 mya (Pereira et al. 2002). This data must be considered preliminary until corroborated by material (e.g. fossil) evidence however.

What appears certain from analysis of the molecular data, calibrated against geological events that would have induced speciation is that there are 2 major lineages of curassows: one containing only Crax, and another made up of Mitu and Pauxi. The position of the peculiar nocturnal curassow is not well resolved; it might be closer to the latter, but in any case, it diverged around the same time as the split between the two major lineages. All curassow genera appear to have diverged, in fact, during the Tortonian (early Late Miocene): the initial split took place some 10–9 mya, and Pauxi diverged from Mitu some 8–7.4 mya (but see genus article).(Pereira & Baker 2004)

Unlike the other cracids, biogeography and phylogeny indicate that the extant lineages of curassows probably originated in the lowlands of the western/northwestern Amazonas basin, most likely in the general area where the borders of Brazil, Peru and Colombia meet. In the two larger genera, vicariant speciation seems to have played a major role.(Pereira et al. 2002, Pereira & Baker 2004)

References

 Pereira, Sérgio Luiz & Baker, Allan J. (2004): Vicariant speciation of curassows (Aves, Cracidae): a hypothesis based on mitochondrial DNA phylogeny. Auk 121(3): 682–694. [English with Spanish abstract] DOI:10.1642/0004-8038(2004)121[0682:VSOCAC]2.0.CO;2 HTML abstract HTML fulltext without images 
 Pereira, Sérgio Luiz; Baker, Allan J.& Wajntal, Anita (2002): Combined nuclear and mitochondrial DNA sequences resolve generic relationships within the Cracidae (Galliformes, Aves). Systematic Biology 51(6): 946–958.   PDF fulltext

Extant Oligocene first appearances

pl:Czubacze